Bastilla tahitiensis is a moth of the family Noctuidae first described by Orhant in 2002. It is endemic to Tahiti and Moorea.

It was formerly considered to be a subspecies of Bastilla solomonensis.

References

Bastilla (moth)